La Fe or La Fé, Spanish for "The Faith", may refer to:

Places
La Fe (also named Santa Fe), a village of Isla de la Juventud, Cuba
La Fe (Sandino), a village of Pinar del Río Province, Cuba
Ensanche La Fé, a district of the city of Santo Domingo, Dominican Republic

Other uses
La Fé (film), a 1947 film by Cesáreo González
Alfredo de la Fé (b. 1954), a Cuban violinists
Colegio La Fe, a school in Naguanagua, Venezuela
Centro de Salud Familiar La Fe, a health clinic and community center in El Paso, Texas.

See also
Fe (disambiguation)
Fee (disambiguation)